Tankai-ike dam is an earthfill dam located in Shiga prefecture in Japan. The dam is used for irrigation. The catchment area of the dam is 30 km2. The dam impounds about 12  ha of land when full and can store 1320 thousand cubic meters of water. The construction of the dam was completed in 1934.

References

Dams in Shiga Prefecture
1934 establishments in Japan